"Goin' Crazy" is a song by Dizzee Rascal, featuring vocals from English singer-songwriter Robbie Williams. The song was written and produced by Tim Anderson and Jamin "J-Man" Wilcox, with additional production by Nick Cage, and co-written by Dizzee Rascal. The song was released on 16 June 2013 as a digital download in the United Kingdom as the lead single from his upcoming fifth studio album The Fifth (2013). Dizzee originally had producers Jamin Wilcox and Tim Anderson singing the chorus but the label wanted Robbie Williams as a better business option due to his notoriety. Wilcox however did sing on the song "Life keeps moving on.

Live performances 
On 24 May 2013, Dizzee Rascal surprised fans at Radio 1's Big Weekend in Ebrington Square, Derry, County Londonderry, Northern Ireland, by performing the song live with a special guest performance from Robbie Williams.

Critical reception 
Robert Copsey of Digital Spy gave the song a mixed review stating:

Track listings

Credits and personnel 
 Vocals – Dizzee Rascal, Robbie Williams
 Lyrics – Dylan Mills, Robbie Williams, Tim Anderson, Jamin Wilcox
 Producer – @Oakwud, Ronald "Flippa" Colson @Flippa123, @PopWansel
 Label: Dirtee Stank, Island Records

Chart performance

Weekly charts

Year-end charts

Release history

References 

2013 singles
Dizzee Rascal songs
Robbie Williams songs
Island Records singles
2013 songs
Songs written by Dizzee Rascal
Songs written by Tim Anderson (musician)